Arkadag (Turkmen arka "behind" + dag "mountain", connoting "protector") is a city in southern Turkmenistan. It became the regional capital of Ahal Province effective 20 December 2022. It is a largely greenfield development started in 2019 with a budget of $1.5 billion. The city was named in honor of former President Gurbanguly Berdimuhamedov, whose official nickname is Arkadag.

Geography
The city is situated on a plain due west of the city limit of Turkmenistan's capital city, Ashgabat, and east of the neighboring city of Gökdepe at latitude 38.0659 degrees north and longitude 58.0727 degrees east. By parliamentary decree of 18 March 2023 the city is divided into two districts, named Kärizek and Gorjaw.

History
In November 2018, then-President Gurbanguly Berdimuhamedow began reviewing project proposals for construction of a new capital for Ahal Province. On 4 March 2019, Berdimuhamedow issued a decree ordering construction to begin. Construction began with a ceremonial laying of the cornerstone of the new provincial administration building on 10 April 2019. Although earlier project proposals had planned for the city's area to cover no more than 880 hectares, the approved project was for 1002 hectares.

By parliamentary decree of 20 December 2022, the city was named Arkadag in honor of Berdimuhamedow, the seat of Ahal Province was moved from Anau to Arkadag, and the nearby village of Aba Annayew was annexed to the city. Local media reported,With the goals of improving living conditions of the population in the framework of the first phase of construction 258 2-, 5-, 7- and 9-story apartment buildings will be built. In addition, 19 retail stores, 3 repair centers, a hotel, a shopping mall and a leisure park are being built.

On 23 January 2023 the municipal court and prosecutor were created by presidential decree. 

Opposition media reported in February 2023 that imported construction materials for the second phase of construction would cost an estimated $1.296 billion, in addition to the presumed original cost of phase one construction of $1.466 billion, implying a total cost of city construction in excess of $2.76 billion. Phase two construction is reported to include...five secondary schools for 720 pupils each, nine kindergartens for 320 children, a polyclinic, fire station...administrative buildings of the mayor of Arkadag, a museum, a square, a shopping center and a household goods store in one building, 36 five-storey apartment buildings with 30 apartments each, 36 five-storey apartment buildings with 40 apartments each, twenty-four 42-apartment seven-storey building, 14 nine-storey buildings of 54 apartments each...a railway station, a bus depot and a taxi dispatcher station, a bus station of Ahal Province. Turkmen state media reported in March 2023 that the second phase of construction is to be completed by 2026.

City inauguration celebrations 
President Serdar Berdimuhamedov ordered the Cabinet of Ministers to prepare celebrations in honor of the city's opening for 2023, including a military parade and concert on the Main Square. The cornerstone of the mosque was laid 20 January 2023.

Architecture

Buildings 
The city was built based on a centralized architectural plan following a design competition involving five separate submissions. All buildings are faced with white marble along symmetrically laid out streets.
The following facilities will be named as follows:

 Gurbanguly Berdimuhamedow Health and Rehabilitation Center
 Arkadag Monument
 Aba Annayev International Academy of Horse Breeding
 Berdimuhamed Annayev Ahal Velayat Pedagogical Secondary Vocational School 
 Sachly Dursunova Ahal Velayat Medical Secondary Vocational School 
 Görogly State Equestrian Circus 
 Döwletmämmet Azady Ahal Velayat Library
 Aman Gulmammedov State Drama Theater
 Sahy Jepbarov Specialized Art School of Ahal Velayat 
 Shukur Bagshy Children's Art School

Smart city 
Arkadag is intended to be Turkmenistan's first "smart city".

Street names
People's Council of Turkmenistan Chairperson and former President of Turkmenistan Berdimuhamedov has proposed naming Arkadag's streets after "great personages, who left their undimmed impact on national culture, art, literature, and history," and in particular named Berdi Kerbabayev, Kerim Gurbannepesow, Gurbannazar Ezizow, Alty Garlyyev, and Maya Kuliyeva, among others.

See also

 Ahal Region

References

Further reading
 

Populated places in Ahal Region